Simply stated, Klaiber's law proposes that "the silicon wafer size will dictate the largest diameter of ultrapure water supply piping needed within a semiconductor wafer factory."

Ultrapure water (UPW) is used extensively in the fabrication steps of making computer microchips. These microchips are fabricated on round, thin substrates of silicon, called wafers.

Since the 1990s the pipes, fittings and valves used to carry the UPW have increased dramatically in diameter and consequently, so has the delivered volume, or gallons per minute usage. Polyvinylidene fluoride (PVDF) has been the material of choice for the larger conduits to convey the UPW.  PVDF is also referenced in ASTM D 5127 – 07 Standard Guide for Ultra-Pure Water Used in the Electronics and Semiconductor Industries as being needed to maintain the highest qualities of water.

In the early 1990s an observation made by Felix Klaiber has since been referred to as Klaiber’s law. He recognized that the semiconductor's jump from using 100 mm to 150 mm diameter silicon wafers (when the largest conduits in UPW systems of PVDF were only 110 mm in outer diameter) was soon followed by the need for larger 160 mm PVDF conduits.  The next jump to 200 mm silicon wafers a few years later required 225 mm PVDF conduits.  More recently, the semiconductor's jump to 300 mm wafers has required the need for even larger UPW systems using 315 mm conduits. 

Since Klaiber's earlier postulation, the relationship between wafer size and the diameter of PVDF conduits has been observed by others. Unbeknownst to Libman, an identical position to Klaiber's Law was discussed during a 2010 presentation; that the current HP (high purity) PVDF piping size is limited to 12 inch (305 mm) and that historically the size of the wafer coincided with the diameter of the main lines. Libman questioned if the trend would continue for 450 mm wafers.

References

Computer architecture statements
Semiconductor device fabrication